Luke Colin Cook (born 14 November 2002) is an English professional footballer who plays as a forward for Sheffield Wednesday.

Career

Sheffield Wednesday
On 4 August 2022, Cook signed for Sheffield Wednesday alongside Adam Alimi-Adetoro for the club's U21 side. He made his professional debut in the EFL Cup six days later, coming off the bench against Sunderland.

Career statistics

References

2002 births
Living people
English footballers
Sheffield Wednesday F.C. players